Year 1087 (MLXXXVII) was a common year starting on Friday (link will display the full calendar) of the Julian calendar.

Events

By place

Europe 
 Summer – The Taifa of Valencia falls under the domination of Rodrigo Díaz de Vivar (El Cid). He stabilizes the region around Valencia, which has revolted against the Moorish puppet ruler Al-Qadir.
 Inge the Elder returns to Svealand and kills his brother-in-law Blot-Sweyn after a 3-year reign. Inge again proclaims himself king of Sweden (approximate date).

England 
 September 9 – King William I (the Conqueror) dies in Rouen after a fall from his horse. He is succeeded by his third son William II who becomes king of England.
 A fire in London destroys much of the city, including St. Paul's Cathedral. Bishop Maurice starts the rebuilding of a new, much larger cathedral.

Africa 
 Mahdia campaign: The navies of Genoa and Pisa take the capital of the Zirids, and occupy Mahdia for a year. Subsequently, both republics obtain trading privileges.
 Completion of Bab al-Futuh, Cairo

Japan 
 January 3 – Emperor Shirakawa abdicates in favor of his 7-year-old son Horikawa after a 14-year reign. He exerts his personal power to set the cloistered rule system further in motion.

Middle East
 May: The marriage of Caliph al-Muqtadi and Mah-i Mulk is consummated. This marriage strengthens the political relation of Malik-Shah I and the Caliph.

By topic

Religion 
 May 9 – The relics of Saint Nicholas, patron saint of seafarers, are stolen by Italian sailors from his church in Myra (modern Turkey) and transported to Bari in southern Italy.
 September 16 – Pope Victor III dies after a 1-year pontificate at Monte Cassino. He is buried in the abbey's chapter house.
</onlyinclude>

Births 
 September 13 – John II Komnenos, Byzantine emperor (d. 1143)
 Ibn Quzman, Andalusian poet and writer (approximate date)
 Reginald III (or Renaud), count of Burgundy (approximate date)
 Theoderich I of Are (or Dietrich), German nobleman (d. 1126)

Deaths 
 June 9 – Otto I (the Fair), prince of Olomouc (b. 1045)
 June 27 – Henry I (the Long), margrave of the Nordmark
 September 9 – William I (the Conqueror), king of England
 September 16 – Victor III, pope of the Catholic Church
 September 25 – Simon I, French nobleman (b. 1025)
 November 12 – William I, French nobleman (b. 1020)
 December 13 – Maria Dobroniega, duchess of Poland
 December 27 – Bertha of Savoy, Holy Roman Empress (b. 1051)
 Abu Bakr ibn Umar, military leader of the Almoravids
 Abū Ishāq Ibrāhīm al-Zarqālī, Arab astrologer (b. 1029)
 Arnold of Soissons (or Arnoul), French bishop (b. 1040)
 Asma bint Shihab, queen and co-regent of Yemen
 Blot-Sweyn, king of Svealand (approximate date) 
 Eustace II, count of Boulogne (approximate date)
 Leo Diogenes, Byzantine co-emperor (b. 1069)
 Solomon (or Salomon), king of Hungary (b. 1053)
 Yaropolk Izyaslavich, prince of Turov and Volhyn

References